The Roman Catholic Diocese of Hamhung  is a diocese of the Latin Church of the Roman Catholic Church in North Korea. 

Originally erected as the Apostolic Vicariate of Wonsan in 1920, the name has been changed twice, once to Kankoensis o Hameungensis in 1940, and finally, as the Apostolic Vicariate of Hamhung in 1950. Like the Diocese of Pyongyang, the Vicariate was elevated to a full diocese in 1962. The diocese is a suffragan of the Archdiocese of Seoul.

Persecutions
In 1949, 166 priests and religious were martyred in the Communist revolution of Kim Il-sung. This left the diocese bereft of priests. Bishop Boniface Sauer, the abbot of Tokwon Abbey, had died in 1950, and no bishop had been re-appointed to the diocese. Finally, in 1962, Timotheus (Franz Xaver) Bitterli, was appointed in absentia as the bishop of the diocese, and was the apostolic administrator for 20 years until his resignation in 1981. Since then, the diocese has remained vacant, and it will likely remain so as long as the persecution of Christians in North Korea continues.

Ordinaries

Vicars Apostolic of Hamheung 
Bonifatius Sauer, OSB (1920-1950) 
Timotheus Bitterli, OSB (1950–1962; apostolic administrator)

Bishops of Hamhung 
Timotheus Bitterli, OSB (1962–1981; apostolic administrator)
Abbot Placidus Lee Dong-ho (1981–2005; apostolic administrator)
John Chang Yik (2005–2010; apostolic administrator)
Luke Kim Woon-hoe (2010–2020; apostolic administrator)
Simon Kim Ju-young (2020–present; apostolic administrator)

See also
Catholic Church in North Korea
Religion in North Korea
Territorial Abbey of Tokwon

References

External links
 
 

Roman Catholic dioceses in North Korea
Christian organizations established in 1920
Hamhung
Hamhung
Roman Catholic Ecclesiastical Province of Seoul